Venkitangu  is a Panchayath in Thrissur district in the state of Kerala, India.

Venkitangu is a Village located in Mullassery Block in the Thrissur District of Kerala, India. It belong to the Central Kerala Division. It is located 14 km west from District headquarters Thrissur, 3 km from Mullassery and 286 km from State capital Thiruvananthapuram.

The pin code of Venkitangu is 680510 and the postal head office is Venkitangu.

Manalur ( 4 km ), Engandiyur ( 5 km ), Elavally ( 6 km ), Arimpoor ( 6 km ), Adat ( 6 km ) are nearby villages of Venkitangu. Venkitangu is surrounded by Thalikkulam Block towards South, Chavakkad Block towards North, Puzhakkal Block towards North and Anthikkad Block towards South.

Thrissur, Kunnamkulam, Guruvayoor, Irinjalakuda and Chalakudy are the nearby cities of Venkitangu. It is home to the famous Karuvanthala temple.	

It is near the Arabian sea and there is a chance of humidity in the weather.

Demographics
 India census, Venkitangu had a population of 11,680 with 5441 males and 6239 females.

Name

The name of "Venkitangu" is derived from the word  "van kidangu" (big city).

References

Villages in Thrissur district